Fort Grey TB Hospital is a specialised Provincial government-funded TB hospital situated in East London, Eastern Cape in South Africa. It was established in 1955 and used to be a SANTA TB hospital.

The hospital departments include an Out Patients Department, Pharmacy, Anti-Retroviral (ARV) treatment for HIV/AIDS, X-ray Services, Laundry Services, Kitchen Services and Mortuary.

References
 Fort Grey TB Hospital

Hospitals in the Eastern Cape
Tuberculosis sanatoria
East London, Eastern Cape